The 2019–20 Fenerbahçe season was the club's 62nd consecutive season in the Süper Lig and their 112th year in existence.

Club

Board of Directors 
You can see the fields of the board members by moving the pointer to the dotted field.

Staff 
The list of the staff is below.

Facilities 

|}

Kits
Fenerbahçe's 2019–20 kits, manufactured by Adidas, were introduced on 18 July 2019.

Supplier: Adidas
Main sponsor: Avis

Back sponsor: Halley
Sleeve sponsor: HeForShe

Short sponsor: Aygaz

Players

First-team squad

|-
|colspan=12 align=center|Players sold or loaned out after the start of the season

Transfers

In

Out

Total spending:  €15.75M – ₺1M

Total income:  €16.1M – ₺3.8M

Expenditure:  €0.35M    ₺2.8M

Pre-season and friendlies

Pre-season

Mid-season

Competitions

Overview

Süper Lig

League table

Results summary

Pld = Matches played; W = Matches won; D = Matches drawn; L = Matches lost; GF = Goals for; GA = Goals against; GD = Goal difference; Pts = Points

Results by round

Matches

Turkish Cup

Fourth round

Fifth round

Round of 16

Quarter-finals

Semi-finals

Statistics

Squad statistics

Notes

References

Fenerbahçe S.K. (football) seasons
Fenerbahce